Rock Hill is an unincorporated community in Ohio Township, Spencer County, in the U.S. state of Indiana.

History
The community took its name from a nearby rock formation.

Geography

References

Unincorporated communities in Spencer County, Indiana
Unincorporated communities in Indiana